The Tomaga River, an open mature wave dominated barrier estuary or perennial stream, is located in the South Coast region of New South Wales, Australia.

Course and features
The river descends  over its  course.

See also

 Rivers of New South Wales
 List of rivers of New South Wales (L–Z)
 List of rivers of Australia

References

 

Rivers of New South Wales
South Coast (New South Wales)
Eurobodalla Shire